Bear Branch is a stream in Iron and 
Reynolds counties in the U.S. state of Missouri. It is a tributary of the Black River.

The source area for the stream is southwest of Annapolis and the stream flows parallel to Missouri Route K to join the Black at the north end of Clearwater Lake.

Bear Branch was named for the bears along its course.

See also
List of rivers of Missouri

References

Rivers of Iron County, Missouri
Rivers of Reynolds County, Missouri
Rivers of Missouri